The PBA Women's Series was a mini-tour for female professional bowlers. It was started in 2007 as a way to bring women's bowling back to television after the Professional Women's Bowling Association (PWBA) disbanded in 2003. Sponsored by the United States Bowling Congress (USBC) and its website bowl.com, it ran concurrently with several stops on the Professional Bowlers Association's men's tour.

After the PWBA folded, female bowlers have had very few national venues in which to bowl, other than the USBC Queens event. A few female bowlers, including Carolyn Dorin-Ballard, Liz Johnson and Kelly Kulick, began competing on the "men's" PBA Tour with limited success. The U.S. Women's Open was resurrected by the USBC in 2007, and it also spawned the creation of the women's series. A four-event trial series was run during the early weeks of the 2007-08 PBA season. The series was expanded to eight events in each of the 2008-09 and 2009-10 seasons, but was not continued into the 2010-11 season.

2007 Women's Series

The trial PBA Women's Series featured four events during the first six weeks of the 2007-08 PBA season.

2007 Women's Series Results

2008–09 Women's Series

The PBA Women's Series continued in the 2008–09 season with seven events. The 2008–09 format was similar to that used in 2007–08, with two televised finalists advancing from a field of sixteen qualifiers in five of the events. One event featured a qualifying round of 32, with the top two advancing. The final televised event was a mixed doubles tournament, where 16 Women's Series bowlers were paired with 16 male PBA bowlers following separate qualifying rounds for each. The top five doubles teams competed in a "Baker style" stepladder final (male and female bowlers alternate frames during each game).

2008–09 Women's Series Participants and Results

The four 2007 Women's Series winners were automatically entered into the qualifying field for each week of the 2008–09 series.  Complementing them were twelve entrants from the PBA Women's Series Trials that were held in conjunction with the U.S. Women's Open. The 2008 U.S. Women's Open took place July 31–August 6 at Brunswick Zone XL Lanes in Romeoville, IL, where Kim Terrell-Kearney was crowned U.S. Women's Open champion. (Terrell-Kearney, busy with a coaching career, declined the opportunity to compete in the Women's Series.)

While the U.S. Women's Open itself required a $250 entry fee, those who wanted a chance to qualify for the PBA Women's Series had to pay an additional $750.  Those who qualified were also required to become PBA members, if they were not already.

The results for the 2008–09 PBA Women's Series were as follows:

+Made field of 16 as an alternate.

2009-10 Women's Series

The 2009–10 PBA Women's Series Tour Trials were held in conjunction with the Women's U.S. Open, August 3–9 in Las Vegas, NV.  The PBA announced that the fields for at least the first five 2009–10 PBA Women's Series events (all held August 15–September 4 at the PBA World Series of Bowling in Allen Park, MI) would increase from 16 to 20.  Two additional spots were up for grabs at the women's Tour Trials, while the other two come from a Tour Qualifying Round (TQR) in each event.

Each event at the World Series of Bowling had the final round taped September 5–6 for ESPN broadcasts in October–December, 2009.  This included the finals for the Women's PBA World Championship event, broadcast October 25, 2009 in conjunction with the finals of the Senior PBA World Championship.

The PBA Women's Series continued into 2010 with the Don and Paula Carter Mixed Doubles event, the Earl Anthony Memorial and the PBA Women's Series Showdown.

2009–10 Women's Series Results

The results for the 2009–10 PBA Women's Series were as follows:

References

 
Ten-pin bowling competitions in the United States